SR20 may refer to:

 Cirrus SR20, a piston engine composite monoplane
 Nissan SR engine, a Nissan straight-4 4-stroke engine
 State Road 2 or State Route 2; see List of highways numbered 20